The 1933–34 Montreal Canadiens season was the team's 25th season of play. The Canadiens again qualified for the playoffs, finishing third in their division. The club met and lost to the Chicago Black Hawks in the playoffs.

Regular season
Star player Howie Morenz continued the decline in his play, and was placed on the second line. His ankle was seriously injured on January 2, 1934, and he missed nine games but did not play well for the rest of the season. He was the target of trade speculation at the end of the season, with the Boston Bruins, Chicago Blackhawks, Detroit Red Wings and New York Rangers all interested in him.

Final standings

Record vs. opponents

Schedule and results

Playoffs
In the first round the Canadiens met the eventual Stanley Cup champion Chicago Blackhawks, who had placed second in the American Division. The Canadiens lost the two-games total-goals series 3–4 (2–3, 1–1). Morenz missed the second game due to a broken thumb.

 Chicago Blackhawks vs. Montreal Canadiens

Player statistics

Regular season
Scoring

Goaltending

Playoffs
Scoring

Goaltending

Transactions
 George Hainsworth was traded to Toronto for Lorne Chabot, October 1, 1933.
 Wilf Cude received by Canadiens from Philadelphia for cash, October 19, 1933.
 Wilf Cude loaned to Detroit by Canadiens January 2, 1934

See also
1933–34 NHL season

References

Notes

Montreal Canadiens seasons
Montreal Canadiens
Montreal Canadiens